Springhill is an unincorporated community in Faulkner County, Arkansas, United States.

The Titan II ICBM Launch Complex 374-5 Site, which is listed on the National Register of Historic Places, is near the community.

Education 
Public education for elementary and secondary school students is primarily provided by the Greenbrier School District, beginning at the district's Springhill Elementary School and leading to graduation from Greenbrier High School.

References

Unincorporated communities in Faulkner County, Arkansas
Unincorporated communities in Arkansas